Keith Beach  is a retired American soccer midfielder who spent one season in Major League Soccer.

Youth
Beach attended the University of Maryland where he played on the men's soccer team from 1995 to 1998.  He was a 1998 Third Team All American and holds the Terrapin career assists record with thirty-five.

Professional
On February 6, 1999, D.C. United drafted Beach in the second round (seventeenth overall) of the 1999 MLS College Draft.  Beach did not sign with United, put pursued a career in Europe, joining Clydebank.  On February 7, 2000, United the rights to Beach and its second round 2001 MLS SuperDraft selection to the Miami Fusion in exchange for the forty-first selection in the 2000 MLS SuperDraft.  Beach spent the 2000 season in Miami, going on loan to the MLS Project 40 during the season.  On March 10, 2001, the Fusion released him.  In 2001, he played for the Atlanta Silverbacks in the USL A-League.

References

External links 
 CNNSI: Keith Beach

1976 births
Living people
American soccer players
American expatriate soccer players
Association football defenders
Atlanta Silverbacks players
Major League Soccer players
Maryland Terrapins men's soccer players
Miami Fusion players
A-League (1995–2004) players
Clydebank F.C. (1965) players
MLS Pro-40 players
Expatriate footballers in Scotland
D.C. United draft picks
Sportspeople from the New York metropolitan area
American expatriate sportspeople in Scotland
Soccer players from New York (state)